Division II is the fourth level division tournament organized by the Sri Lanka Football Federation.

References

4